The white-tipped dove (Leptotila verreauxi) is a large New World tropical dove. Its scientific name commemorates the French naturalists Jules and Edouard Verreaux.

Distribution and habitat

The dove is a resident breeder from southernmost Texas in the United States through Mexico and Central America south to western Peru and central Argentina. It also breeds on the offshore islands of northern South America, including Trinidad and Tobago and the Netherlands Antilles. It inhabits scrub, woodland and forest.

Subspecies
Numerous subspecies exist; some of the more widespread are:
 L. v. verreauxi – Bonaparte, 1855: the nominate taxon, found from Nicaragua to Venezuela 
 L. v. angelica – Bangs & Penard, TE, 1922: found from Texas and coastal Mexico 
 L. v. decolor – Salvin, 1895: found west of the Andes from Colombia to northern Peru 
 L. v. brasiliensis – (Bonaparte, 1856): found in most of the Amazon north of the Amazon River 
 L. v. decipiens – (Salvadori, 1871): found in much of central South America

Description
Adult birds of most races have a grey tinge from the crown to the nape, a pale grey or whitish forehead and a whitish throat. The eye-ring is typically red in most of its range, but blue in most of the Amazon and northern South America. The upperparts and wings are grey-brown, and the underparts are whitish shading to pinkish, dull grey or buff on the chest. The underwing coverts are rufous. The tail is broadly tipped with white, but this is best visible from below or in flight. The bill is black, the legs are red and the iris is yellow.

The white-tipped dove resembles the closely related grey-fronted dove (Leptotila rufaxilla), which prefers humid forest habitats. The best distinctions are the greyer forehead and crown, which contrast less with the hindcrown than in the grey-fronted dove. In the area of overlap, the white-tipped dove usually has a blue (not red) eye-ring, but this is not reliable in some parts of Brazil, Argentina, Bolivia, Paraguay and Uruguay, where it typically is red in both species.

Behaviour

The white-tipped dove is usually seen alone or in pairs, and is rather wary. They remain in their territory and do not migrate. Its flight is fast and direct, with the regular beats and clattering of the wings, characteristic of pigeons in general. They live in a variety of woodland habitats. The call is a deep hollow ooo-wooooo.

Breeding
It builds a large stick nest in a tree near ground level and lays two white eggs. Incubation is about 14 days, and fledging another 15.

Feeding
The food is mainly seeds obtained by foraging on the ground, but it will also take insects, including butterflies and moths.

Vocal 
They utilize their voice to perform a variety of tasks: defend territory, attract potential mates, indicate food resources, alert  predators, and maintain group contact.

Two notes at the same pitch is their signature call: an introductory hoot followed by a longer, more audible, hollow note.

References

External links

 
 Stamps for Argentina, Belize and Netherlands Antilles with Range Map at bird-stamps.org
 
 

white-tipped dove
Birds of Central America
Birds of South America
Birds of Trinidad and Tobago
Birds of Uruguay
white-tipped dove
white-tipped dove
Birds of the Amazon Basin
Birds of Brazil
Birds of Mexico
Birds of the Sierra Madre Occidental
Birds of the Sierra Madre Oriental
Birds of the Sierra Madre del Sur
Birds of the Trans-Mexican Volcanic Belt